Yuehu  is a district of the city of Yingtan, Jiangxi province, China.

Administrative divisions
In the present, Yuehu District has 6 subdistricts 1 towns and 1 township.
6 subdistricts

1 town
 Tongjia

1 township
 Xiabu

References

Administrative subdivisions of Jiangxi